Philipp Forchheimer (7 August 1852 in Vienna – 2 October 1933 in Dürnstein, Lower Austria) was an Austrian engineer, a pioneer in the field of civil engineering and practical hydraulics, who also contributed to the archaeological study of Byzantine water supply systems. He was professor in Istanbul, Aachen and Graz.

Forchheimer introduced mathematical methodology to the study of hydraulics, thus establishing a scientific basis for the field. He graduated as engineer from the Technische Hochschule Zürich in 1873, received his doctoral degree from the University of Tübingen, and completed habilitation at the Technische Hochschule Aachen. He was the rector of the Graz University of Technology until 1897. In addition to his teaching, he worked as a consultant for underground construction projects. He made proposals for the construction of a tunnel under the English Channel.

In 1891 he took up a parallel appointment in Constantinople at the Ottoman School of Engineering, which he successfully re-organised in 1914. His work in Turkey led to a study of the Byzantine cisterns with the archaeologist Josef Strzygowski. In 1897 or 1898, he spent a month researching aqueduct systems at the Austrian excavations in Ephesus.

Modification to Darcy's Law 
Forchheimer proposed a modification to Darcy's Law, describing fluid flow through packed beds in 1901. This also had a significant influence on the development of the Ergun equation.

where:

 is the pressure drop across the bed,
 is the viscosity of the fluid,
 permeability (const.),
 is the (area-averaged) velocity of the fluid,
 is an empirical constant,
 is the density of the fluid.

A more general expression of the friction factor follows from Forchheimers modification:

where  is the Reynolds number and C is a constant.

Works
 Englische Tunnelbauten bei Untergrundbahnen, sowie unter Flüssen und Meeresarmen, Aachen 1884
 Die Eisenbahn von Ismid nach Angora, Berlin 1891 (offprint from Zeitschrift für Bauwesen 41 (1891): 359–379)
 Die byzantinischen Wasserbehälter von Konstantinopel. Beiträge zur Geschichte der byzantinischen Baukunst und zur Topographie von Konstantinopel (with Josef Strzygowski), Wien 1893
 Lehr- und Handbuch der Hydraulik, 5 volumes, 1914–16
 "Wasserleitungen", in Forschungen in Ephesos, vol. 3, Wien 1923, pp. 224–255

Notes

References

See also 
 Darcy's Law
 Ergun Equation
 Reynold's Number

Engineers from Graz
Hydrologists
Academic staff of RWTH Aachen University
1852 births
1933 deaths
Academic staff of the Graz University of Technology
Travelers in Asia Minor